The 2005 Hockenheimring GP2 Series round was a GP2 Series motor race held on July 23 and 24, 2005 at the Hockenheimring in Baden-Württemberg, Germany. It was the seventh round of the 2005 GP2 Series season. The race weekend supported the 2005 German Grand Prix.

Nico Rosberg, who was the polesitter for the second consecutive feature race, won in the first race, his third victory in four races. The feature race podium was completed by Rosberg's fellow ART Grand Prix driver Alexandre Prémat, and Nelson Piquet Jr., of Hitech/Piquet Racing.

Frenchman Olivier Pla, who was on reverse grid pole for the second consecutive round after again finishing eighth in the feature race, took the win in the sprint race, ahead of Super Nova's Giorgio Pantano and iSport's Scott Speed.

Rosberg scored nineteen points at Hockenheim, while Heikki Kovalainen could only manage five, allowing the German to reduce Kovalainen's Drivers' Championship lead to just six points, with five rounds remaining. Rosberg's ART team moved into the lead of the Teams' Championship standings, in the process overtaking Kovalainen's Arden team.

Classification

Qualifying

Feature race

Sprint race

Standings after the round

Drivers' Championship standings

Teams' Championship standings

 Note: Only the top five positions are included for both sets of standings.

References

Hockenheimring
GP2